Patricia Horvath (born 7 December 1977) was a Hungarian water polo player. She was a member of the Hungary women's national water polo team, playing as a goalkeeper. 

She was a part of the  team at the 2008 Summer Olympics. 
On club level, she played for Honvéd-Domino in Hungary.

See also
 Hungary women's Olympic water polo team records and statistics
 List of women's Olympic water polo tournament goalkeepers
 List of world champions in women's water polo
 List of World Aquatics Championships medalists in water polo

References

External links
 

1977 births
Living people
People from Miskolc
Hungarian female water polo players
Water polo goalkeepers
Olympic water polo players of Hungary
Water polo players at the 2008 Summer Olympics
21st-century Hungarian women